Aalborg Stiftstidende was a Danish language newspaper based in Aalborg, Denmark. The paper was published between 1767 and 1999 and is the predecessor of Nordjyske Stiftstidende.

History and profile
The paper was established by a group of priests in Aalborg in 1767. It was part of the Stiftstidende dailies. The other two Stiftstidende newspapers were published in Odense, Fyens Stiftstidende and in Aarhus, Århus Stiftstidende.

The paper was published by Aalborg Stiftstidende A/S. Aalborg Stiftstidende had no political affiliation. However, the paper was close to the Chamber of Industry and Commerce and was a member of the Chamber.

By November 1996 Aalborg Stiftstidende started its website.

During the first half of 1988 Aalborg Stiftstidende sold 72,857 copies on weekdays and 98,561 copies on Sundays. From 1999 the paper was published under the name Nordjyske Stiftstidende.

See also
List of newspapers in Denmark

References

Aalborg Stiftstidende
Aalborg Stiftstidende
Aalborg Stiftstidende
Aalborg Stiftstidende
Aalborg Stiftstidende
Aalborg Stiftstidende
Aalborg Stiftstidende
Aalborg Stiftstidende